Peter Fortune is a British Conservative politician serving as the Member of the London Assembly (AM) for Bexley and Bromley since 2021. At the time of his election, he was a councillor for Hayes and Coney Hall ward and Deputy Leader of the London Borough of Bromley.

He was born and raised in Lambeth. In 2017, he became Deputy Leader of Bromley Council.

He contested Leeds Central at the 2019 United Kingdom general election and  Lewisham East at the 
2017 United Kingdom general election

References 

Year of birth missing (living people)
Living people
Conservative Members of the London Assembly
Councillors in the London Borough of Bromley
People from Lambeth